Shaheen Sheik (born June 17, 1975) is an American, singer, song-writer, producer, dancer and an actor based in Los Angeles, California.  Her musical work spans several genres, including rock/pop, electronic and chill-out music. She grew up in Cleveland and Los Angeles, but traces her roots to Tiruchirappalli, Tamil Nadu, India.

Early years
Shaheen Sheik was born in Cleveland, Ohio to Iqbal Sheik, a psychiatrist, and Sharfudheen Sheik, a mechanical engineer. She also has an older brother, Zafar Sheik, a physician in Warren, Ohio.  When she was a teenager, Sheik's family moved to Orange County, California.

As a child, Sheik was a studied classical dancer and later in life began studying vocal, guitar and sarod. She received her B.A. in Anthropology from the University of California, Berkeley and then studied law at the University of Virginia School of Law.

Career
In 2000, after graduating from law school, Sheik worked full-time on her musical career. She credits her learning to become a singer and performer with a weekly residency at San Francisco's Lush Lounge. Soon after, Sheik moved to Los Angeles and began making the open mic circuit with contemporaries, Catherine Feeny, Alexi Murdoch and Joe Purdy.

In 2003, Sheik released her first album, Live from Santosha, in 2003, featuring performances from her live shows at Los Angeles' Genghis Cohen. Later that same year, Sheik released her first studio EP, "In Your Love."

Her first full-length album, Rock Candy, was released in May 2005, with her single "Wildflower World" being featured on MTV Desi.  The album was later picked up by Times Music India. During a tour in Mumbai, Sheik was recognized as being "compared to Sheryl Crow and Shawn Colvin" by Express India. In 2008, Sheik released her second album Revolution, a world electronic album and departure from the guitar driven Rock Candy. When discussing Revolution, Sheik has stated that being a trained dancer taught her the connection between rhythm and emotion and that her second album focused on that connection.

After releasing Revolution, Sheik met Swedish producer, SoulAvenue, on MySpace. In 2008, SoulAvenue remixed Wildflower World (Wild Orchid Mix), which was included on Chillbar: Vol. 1.  SoulAvenue then remixed Sheik's Revolution track, "Here We Go," which George V Records placed on Buddha Bar XII, mixed by DJ Ravin.  On their third collaboration, Sheik and SoulAvenue's co-wrote "One By One", which was included on Buddha Bar XIII, again mixed by DJ Ravin.  SoulAvenue and Sheik continue their collaborations to date, with tracks included on Buddha Bar XIV (2012), Buddha Bar XV (2013), Buddha Bar Greatest Hits (2019) and Buddha Bar Summer of Chill (2020).

Dance
Sheik is a classically trained Bharatanatyam dancer and studied under Malathi Iyengar, artistic director of Rangoli Dance Company. In 2005, 2006, and 2008, Sheik received Lestor Horton Dance Award nominations for her performances in 'Ragamalika Varnam,' 'Kodhai's Dream', and Jatiswaram ('Kodhai's Dream'). The Los Angeles Times described Sheik's portrayal of Krishna in 'Kodhai's Dream' as "commanding" and her duet with fellow company dancer, Lakshmi Iyengar, as "a breathtaking finale."  On October 11, 2016, Shaheen founded Amala Collectiv, a Bharatanatyam dance school and performing arts collective committed to the South Asian Arts diaspora.

Acting
Sheik played Anisha Kishore in the film "Looking for Comedy in the Muslim World."

Personal life
In 2007, Sheik married real estate developer, Harpal Sadhal. She gave birth to their daughter in 2010 and their son in 2012.

Discography
Albums
 Live From Santosha (2003)
 In Your Love  (EP) (2003)
 Rock Candy (2005)
 Revolution (May 1, 2008)

Compilations
 "Wildflower World (Wild Orchid Mix)" – Chillbar Volume 1 (2008)
 "Here We Go (SoulAvenue Erhu Blues Mix)" – Buddha Bar Volume 12 (2010)
 SoulAvenue featuring Shaheen Sheik "One by One" – Buddha Bar Volume 13 (2011)
 SoulAvenue featuring Shaheen Sheik "Different (SoulAvenue's Boddhisatva Blues)" – Buddha Bar Volume 14 (2012)
 Shaheen Sheik and SoulAvenue "Lullaby for Samiyah" – Buddha Bar Volume 15 (2013)
SoulAvenue featuring Shaheen Sheik "One by One" - Buddha Bar Greatest Hits (2019)
SoulAvenue featuring Shaheen Sheik "Refugee" - Buddha Bar Summer of Chill (2020)

References

External links
 Shaheen Sheik's website
 Shaheen Sheik's myspace
 A Tune of Her Own, Nirali Magazine, September 2004
 Screen India Interview

Living people
American people of Indian Tamil descent
American musicians of Indian descent
American women singer-songwriters
Tamil singers
1975 births
Singers from Los Angeles
University of California, Berkeley alumni
University of Virginia School of Law alumni
21st-century American singers
21st-century American women singers
Singer-songwriters from California